Saint Joseph's Hospital of Atlanta is an acute care hospital located in Sandy Springs, Georgia. It was a sole part of the Catholic Health East until a partnership with Emory Healthcare and Catholic Health East became effective in January 2012. Saint Joseph's (also known as SJHA) was recognized as one of the 50 finest hospitals in the country by HealthGrades for 2007.

Founded by the Sisters of Mercy in 1880, Saint Joseph's facility is Atlanta's oldest hospital.

History

Opened by four Mercy sisters, it was the first hospital in the city after the Civil War. In 1900, Atlanta Hospital began its School of Nursing where it educated and trained more than 1,320 nurses over the next 73 years. Through the years, the Hospital grew and became known as the St. Joseph's Infirmary. The hospital has had three locations throughout its history: Baker Street, Courtland Street, and currently a  site just inside the perimeter of Atlanta. It is where the Atlanta Marriott Marquis is currently located. The current campus was dedicated in 1978 when the hospital was renamed Saint Joseph's Hospital of Atlanta (SJHA).

The site has expanded greatly since it was opened in 1978 and now accommodates 410 beds serviced by over 750 physicians. The hospital had 16,358 admissions in the most recent available data. It performed 7,251 annual inpatient and 4,939 outpatient surgeries. There were 33,745 visits to its emergency room. Saint Joseph's Hospital of Atlanta is a non-profit hospital.

Awards
Saint Joseph's has received the distinguished Magnet Recognition for Nursing Excellence by American Nurses Association Credentialing Center. The hospital was named best in Georgia and top 5% in the country for cardiac and vascular programs. It also made Solucient's list of the top 100 hospitals in the nation for cardiac and orthopedic service. Additionally, Saint Joseph's is the only hospital in Atlanta honored on J.D. Power and Associates Distinguished Hospital Program for Service Excellence.

Movie location
A number of movies have been filmed onsite. These include Ring of Fire, Flight, Anchorman 2, Dumb and Dumber To, as well as the USA network television show Necessary Roughness.

References

External links
 Official website
 Best Hospitals - US News & World Report

Sandy Springs, Georgia
Hospitals in Georgia (U.S. state)
Hospital buildings completed in 1978
Catholic hospitals in North America
Sisters of Mercy